Modukuru is a village in Guntur district of the Indian state of Andhra Pradesh. It is located in Tsundur mandal of Tenali revenue division.

Modukuru was identified as Panchayath on 17 November 1931. It comes under Vemuru assembly constituency and Bapatla parliament constituency. The village is located in Tsunduru mandal and Tenali taluka. The pin Code is 522318. There are 14 Wards in the village with a population of over 10,000.

Geography
Modukuru is 25 km from Guntur City, 18 km from Tenali, 12 km from Ponnur and 45 km from Vijayawada City.

Agriculture
Modukuru occupies  , with 3760 acres dedicated to agriculture. The main crops are rice, black gram, turmeric, banana, lemon, chili, sugarcane and pulses. It has agricultural, milk and water societies.

Infrastructure
 Street Tube Lights:310
 Mercury Street Lights:9
 No of Streets IN VILLAGE:74
 Total street lengths:7.25 km

References

External links
 
 Photo Gallery

Villages in Guntur district